Streptomyces chromofuscus is a bacterium species from the genus of Streptomyces which has been isolated from soil. Streptomyces chromofuscus produces phospholipase D, herboxidiene, pentalenolactone O and carazostatins.

Further reading

See also 
 List of Streptomyces species

References

External links
Type strain of Streptomyces chromofuscus at BacDive -  the Bacterial Diversity Metadatabase

chromofuscus
Bacteria described in 1958